William Schevill may refer to:
William E. Schevill (1906–1994), American paleontologist
William Valentine Schevill (1864–1951), American artist